LAM Mozambique Airlines was formed as DETADirecção de Exploração dos Transportes Aereos in , and was renamed in 1980 after it was reorganised. Following is a list of destinations LAM Mozambique Airlines flies to as part of its scheduled services, as of February 2021. Destinations served by LAM's subsidiary Moçambique Expresso and those served during the era in which the airline was named DETA are also listed. Each destination is provided with the name of the city served and the name of the country; also listed is the name of the airport served. Terminated destinations are also shown.

List

LAM Mozambique Airlines serves the following destinations, :

References

External links 



LAM Mozambique Airlines

Airlines established in 1980